Gold Award may refer to:

Several organizations issue awards with this name:

A level of the Duke of Edinburgh's Award
Gold Awards, honouring the best performers in Indian television industry
The Gold Award (Girl Scouts of the USA)
The former Gold Award of the Venturing program of the Boy Scouts of America

See also
 Gold (disambiguation)
 Award (disambiguation)
 Gold Star (disambiguation)
 Gold medal (disambiguation)
 Silver Award (disambiguation)
 Bronze Award (disambiguation)